American official war artists have been part of the American military since 1917.  Artists are unlike the objective camera lens which records only a single instant and no more. The war artist captures instantaneous action and conflates earlier moments of the same scene within one compelling image.

History
In World War I, eight artists commissioned as captains in the U.S. Corps of Engineers. These men were sent to Europe to record the activities of the American Expeditionary Forces.

In 1941, the Navy Combat Art Program was founded in order to ensure that competent artists would be present at the scene of history-making events.  Eight active duty artists developed a record of all phases of World War II; and all major naval operations have been depicted by Navy artists.  During the Korean War, the program was revived with two military artists in combat contexts. Since then, artists have been sent to other combat zones, including the Persian Gulf.

The U.S. Army War Art Unit was established in late 1942; and by the spring of 1943, 42 artists were selected.  In May 1943, Congress withdrew funding the unit was inactivated.

The Army's Vietnam Combat Art Program was started in 1966.  Teams of soldier-artists created pictorial accounts and interpretations for the annals of army military history. These teams of five soldier-artists typically spent 60 days of temporary duty (TDY) in Vietnam embedded with various units.  The U. S. Army Center of Military History (CMH) currently includes an Army Art Collection with about 40 representative war artists.

In 1992, the Army Staff Artist Program was attached to the United States Army Center of Military History. Army artists are a permanent part of the Museum Division's Collections Branch.

There are significant differences in the artwork created by the branches of the U.S. military:

Scope
Military art and the work of American military artists includes both peacetime and wartime.  For example, USMC combat artist Kristopher Battles deployed with American forces in Haiti to provide humanitarian relief as part of Operation Unified Response after the disastrous earthquake in 2010.

Select artists

World War I
William James Aylward 
Walter Jack Duncan
Harvey Thomas Dunn
Kerr Eby Marines 
George Matthews Harding
Wallace Morgan
Ernest Clifford Peixotto 
J. Andre Smith.
Don Troiani (born 1949)
Harry Everett Townsend, Army.
Claggett Wilson Army

World War II

 Paul Harding Myers, 1920-2007
McClelland Barclay, 1891–1942 
George Biddle, 1885–1973
Franklin Boggs, 1914-2009 
 Aaron Bohrod, 1907–1992
Howard Brodie, 1915–2010
Manuel Bromberg, 1917–
 Jack Coggins, 1914–2006
 John Steuart Curry, 1897–1946, for information about his war art, see his artwork page
Olin Dows, 1904–1981
 Edward Dugmore, 1915–1996
 William Franklin Draper, 1912–2003
 Nathan Glick, 1912–2002
Albert A Gold, 1916-2006
Mitchell Jamieson, 1915–1976
 Joe Jones, 1909–1963
 Yasuo Kuniyoshi, 1893–1953
 Warren Leopold, 1920–1998
Roger Lewis, 1918-2006
Henry Jay MacMillan (1908 1991) MacMiillan joined the U.S. Army in 1942 and soon became associated with the Army's art program at Fort Belvoir, Va. Attached to the 62nd Engineer Topographical Co. and later the headquarters of the Army's XIX Corps, he served as a combat artist in North Africa, Sicily, Normandy (where he executed a major study of German hedgerow defenses), Belgium, Holland and Germany. During the war, he executed a major body of watercolors and sketches documenting wartime destruction, battlefield landscapes and everyday military life. These were given major exhibitions in 1973 at the Wilmington-New Hanover County Museum and in 1994 (under the title “Behind the Lines”) at the Cape Fear Museum.
Ludwig Mactarian, 1908–1955
John McDermott, 1919–1977
Barse Miller, 1904-1973
 John Cullen Murphy, 1919–2004
 Albert K. Murray, 1906–1992
 Henry Varnum Poor, 1887–1970
 Dwight Shepler, 1905–1974
 Mitchell Siporin, 1910–1976
Sidney Simon, 1917-1997 aka. Sid Simon,
Standish Backus, 1910–1989
Frede Vidar, 1911-1967
Rudolph von Ripper, 1905-1960
 Taro Yashima, 1908–1994

Vietnam Era

Soldier Artist Participants in the U. S. Army Vietnam Combat Artists Program 

 CAT I, 15 Aug - 15 Dec 1966, Roger A. Blum (Stillwell, KS), Robert C. Knight (Newark, NJ), Ronald E. Pepin (East Hartford, CT), Paul Rickert (Philadelphia, PA), Felix R. Sanchez (Fort Madison, IA), John O. Wehrle (Dallas, TX), and supervisor, Frank M. Sherman.
 CAT II, 15 Oct 1966 - 15 Feb 1967, Augustine G. Acuna (Monterey, CA), Alexander A. Bogdanovich (Chicago, IL), Theodore E. Drendel (Naperville, IL), David M. Lavender (Houston, TX), Gary W. Porter (El Cajon, CA), and supervisor, Carolyn M. O'Brien.
 CAT III, 16 Feb - 17 June 1967, Michael R. Crook (Sierra Madre, CA), Dennis O. McGee (Castro Valley, CA), Robert T. Myers (White Sands Missile Range, NM), Kenneth J. Scowcroft (Manassas, VA), Stephen H. Sheldon (Los Angeles, CA), and supervisor, C. Bruce Smyser.
 CAT IV, 15 Aug - 31 Dec 1967, Samuel E. Alexander (Philadelphia, MS), Daniel T. Lopez (Fresno, CA), Burdell Moody (Mesa, AZ), James R. Pollock (Pollock, SD), Ronald A. Wilson (Alhambra, CA), and technical supervisor, Frank M. Thomas.
 CAT V, 1 Nov 1967 - 15 March 1968, Warren W. Buchanan (Kansas City, MO), Philip V. Garner (Dearborn, MI), Phillip W. Jones (Greensboro, NC), Don R. Schol (Denton, TX), John R. Strong (Kanehoe, HI), and technical supervisor, Frank M. Thomas.
 CAT VI, 1 Feb - 15 June 1968, Robert T. Coleman (Grand Rapids, MI), David N. Fairrington (Oakland, CA), John D. Kurtz IV (Wilmington, DE), Kenneth T. McDaniel (Paris, TN), Michael P. Pala (Bridgeport, CT).
 CAT VII, 15 Aug - 31 Dec 1968, Brian H. Clark (Huntington, NY), William E. Flaherty Jr. (Louisville, KY), William C. Harrington (Terre Haute, IN), Barry W. Johnston (Huntsville, AL), Stephen H. Randall (Des Moines, IA), and supervisor, Fitzallen N. Yow.
 CAT VIII, 1 Feb - 15 June 1969, Edward J. Bowen (Carona Del Mar, CA), James R. Drake (Colorado Springs, CO), Roman Rakowsky (Cleveland, OH), Victory V. Reynolds (Idaho Falls, ID), Thomas B. Schubert (Chicago, IL), and supervisor, Fred B. Engel.
 CAT IX, 1 Sept 1969 - 14 Jan 1970, David E. Graves (Lawrence, KS), James S. Hardy (Coronado, CA), William R. Hoettels (San Antonio, TX), Bruce N. Rigby (Dekalb, IL), Craig L. Stewart (Laurel, MD), and supervisor, Edward C. Williams.

Recent conflicts
 Kristopher Battles
 Henry Casselli
 Michael D. Fay

See also
 United States Army Art Program
 Vietnam Combat Artists Program
 United States Air Force Art Program
 War artists
 Military art
 War photography

Notes

References 
 McCloskey, Barbara. (2005).  Artists of World War II. Westport: Greenwood Press. ; OCLC 475496457
 An article from the Wilmington Star News in 2009 by Ben Steelman:

Further reading
 Gallatin, Albert Eugene. Art and the Great War. (New York: E.P. Dutton, 1919). 
 Cornebise, Alfred. Art from the trenches: America's uniformed artists in World War I. (A & M University Press, 1991).
 Harrington, Peter, and Frederic A. Sharf. "A Splendid Little War". The Spanish–American War, 1898: The Artists' Perspective. (London: Greenhill, 1998). 

Mass media of the military of the United States
Military history of the United States
Cultural history of the United States
American war artists
1917 establishments in the United States